The Packard Automotive Plant was an automobile-manufacturing factory in Detroit, Michigan, where luxury cars were made by the Packard Motor Car Company and later by the Studebaker-Packard Corporation. Demoliton began on October 27, 2022 and is ongoing as of March 2023, with some parcels still remaining.

Design and operation

Under Packard

It included the first use of reinforced concrete in the United States for industrial construction in the automobile industry.

The Packard plant was opened in 1903 and contained 10,000 square feet of floor space and at the time was considered the most modern automobile manufacturing facility in the world: modern, efficient, and massive in scale. By 1908, when an enlargement for the construction of trucks was announced, the factory was already six times larger than when constructed and occupied over fourteen acres of space. At its peak the complex employed 40,000 people, including skilled craftsmen involved in over eighty trades. The plant turned out Packard automobiles from 1903 to 1956, except during World War II, when production was shifted to war material, particularly the Packard V-1650 Merlin, which powered the North American P-51 Mustang fighter plane.

Some experimental television broadcasts were conducted from the building, including a condensed production in 1939 of The Merry Widow, featuring a teenaged Betty White.

After Packard
The factory complex closed in 1958, though other businesses operated on the premises or used it for storage until the late 1990s.

In the 1990s, the buildings were used to host infamous "underground" raves and techno parties, including the Spastik party hosted by Richie Hawtin. The majority of the property was claimed by the city of Detroit in 1994 after former owners failed to pay back taxes.

A number of the outer buildings were in use by businesses up through the early 2000s. In 2010, the last remaining tenant, Chemical Processing, announced its intention to vacate the premises after 52 years.

The site was subsequently used as a filming location for many movies and TV shows.

Current status

Since its abandonment, the plant has been a haven for graffiti artists, urban explorers, paintballers and auto scrappers, and much of the wiring and other building materials have been removed from the site. In one incident, vandals pushed a dump truck from the fourth floor. Karen Nagher, the executive director of the nonprofit organization Preservation Wayne, stated that she was irked to see people come from "all over the world" to poke around Detroit. "Piece by piece, they're disassembling those buildings, making it harder and harder to restore them".

Despite many years of neglect and abuse, the reinforced concrete structures remain mostly intact and structurally sound. Portions of the upper floors of several small sections in various buildings have collapsed or been partly demolished and lie in ruins in the wake of several aborted attempts at demolition over the years. The City of Detroit has pledged legal action to have the property demolished or secured. Dominic Cristini, whose claim of ownership is disputed, was said to be conducting construction surveys in advance of full-scale demolition as of early 2012.

On February 5, 2013, it was reported that aluminum letter placards spelling the Nazi slogan "Arbeit macht frei" (work makes one free) were placed in the windows of the E. Grand Boulevard bridge. Community volunteers promptly removed the letters.

In April 2013, it was announced that AMC's Low Winter Sun would be filming around the location. In June 2018, Amazon's The Grand Tour filmed their first episode of Season 3 in Detroit which prominently showed the Packard Plant; the episode debuted on January 18, 2019.

On January 23, 2019, the bridge over Grand Boulevard collapsed. No injuries were reported. In February 2019 a section of the plant owned by the city of Detroit was demolished.

Sale
Due to tax delinquency, the 43 parcels composing the plant were put up for auction in September 2013. The starting bid was $975,000 (the amount owed in taxes) and there were no takers.

Another auction in October 2013 posted a starting bid of $21,000, or about $500 per parcel. This auction closed with a top bid of $6,038,000 by Dr. Jill Van Horn, a Texas-based physician who announced in an email that she would team up with "partners and investors from Detroit, Wall Street and international firms," to turn the site into an "economic engine", refurbishing the plant grounds for a manufactured-house assembly facility. However, the deadline for full payment was missed, prompting Wayne County to initiate talks with the second-highest bidder, Bill Hults, a Chicago-area developer who placed a $2,003,000 bid in the October auction. In a separate email, Dr. Van Horn stated, "It seemed (David Szymanski, Deputy Wayne County Treasurer) had already made up his mind to talk to the second bidder". Hults then made several non-refundable down-payments on the plant, but he ultimately failed to raise the entire sum of his bid.

Around the same time in October 2013, a Spanish investor, Fernando Palazuelo, also expressed interest in securing the Packard Plant. It was purchased for $405,000 on December 12, 2013. Palazuelo, who has developed historic buildings in Spain and Peru, planned on moving into the plant by April 9, his 59th birthday. He planned on having six different uses for the Packard Plant Project (residential, retail, offices, light industry, recreation and art), estimated to cost about $350 million over the next 10 to 15 years. He hoped to bring a big-3 automotive-parts manufacturer to the plant in exchange for a few years of free rent. He also hoped to create a work space for local artists and an upscale go-kart track.

As of August 2016, no redevelopment had taken place at the historic 40-acre site on Detroit's east side. At the time, many remained skeptical that the enormous effort would ever succeed — or even get off the ground — given the nearly half-billion-dollar price tag of the project that Palazuelo had envisioned.

Renovation
In May 2017, Arte Express, the holding company for Palazuelo, held a ground breaking ceremony for phase I of the project which will include the former 121,000-square-foot administrative building on the site. On August 12, 2017, the inaugural public tour of the property was conducted, which included access to the second floor of the administration building on the complex's western side.

Bust and demolition
The city demolished several structures on parcels it owns at the Packard Plant in 2017. In October 2020, it was announced that the original redevelopment vision for the site had been abandoned, and Palazuelo would be placing the property up for sale, with an eye toward large-scale demolition to repurpose the site for industrial use.

On April 7, 2022, Wayne County Circuit Court Judge Brian Sullivan ordered the demolition of the Packard auto plant in Detroit, finding that it had become a public nuisance. The city began a search for contractors in May 2022. In late July 2022, Detroit City Council approved a nearly $1.7 million contract for the demolition of a portion of the Packard Plant. On October 27, 2022, demolition began on building 21 of the northern complex. Demolition finished by the end of December; however, some remnants remained. On January 24, 2023, the city began demolishing a second portion of the plant, building 28, of the southern complex. The city stated that they will save some buildings of the Packard Plant in order to preserve history but will continue to demolish other portions of the plant throughout 2023.

References

Bibliography

External links

 1921 photo with Alvan Macauley - Detroit Public Library
 1920-1923 Packard photo - Detroit Public Library
 1956 factory photo - Detroit Public Library 
 "Largest Abandoned Factory in the World: The Packard Factory, Detroit." Sometimes Interesting. 15 Aug 2011
 Detroit News
 The Abandoned Packard Plant at Detroiturbex.com
 Packard Plant photos
 blog.hemmings.com on Planned demolition mid-2012
 Recent photos of the Packard Plant
 Detroit Free Press photos - then and now
  Packard images in IR

See also
 Ford Piquette Avenue Plant

1911 establishments in Michigan
1958 disestablishments in Michigan
Industrial buildings and structures in Detroit
Albert Kahn (architect) buildings
Former motor vehicle assembly plants
Industrial buildings completed in 1911
Modern ruins
Motor vehicle assembly plants in Michigan
Packard
Unused buildings in Detroit
Mill architecture
Buildings and structures demolished in 2023